Tetsuya Kadoyama (born 22 October 1983) is a Japanese handball player for Toyota Auto Body and the Japanese national team.

He represented Japan at the 2019 World Men's Handball Championship.

References

1983 births
Living people
Japanese male handball players
Handball players at the 2006 Asian Games
Handball players at the 2010 Asian Games
Asian Games bronze medalists for Japan
Asian Games medalists in handball
Medalists at the 2010 Asian Games
Handball players at the 2018 Asian Games
21st-century Japanese people